It's All in Your Head is Eve 6's third studio album.

Background
Released right before they were dropped from RCA Records and subsequently went on hiatus in 2004. Although the album is praised by fans, it is considered an experimental album, which may explain the lackluster sales that led to the band's release from their RCA contract. The first single, "Think Twice", was a hit on alternative rock radio stations. The second single, "At Least We're Dreaming", highlighted a darker side of Eve 6. "Girlfriend" was intended to be the third single from the album, but Eve 6 was released from their contract with RCA before an official release.

The album art for It's All in Your Head, a headless man raising his arms, derives from a wood etching done by a friend of Max Collins. None of the design is computerized and is all from wood etchings.

Track listing

EVE6MediaHQ exclusive digital download

Singles

References

External links

2003 albums
Eve 6 albums
RCA Records albums